Luke Sparks (1711–1768) was an Irish stage actor of the eighteenth century.

He was born in Dublin, the son of a staymaker and brother of Isaac Sparks who also became an actor. His first known role was at the Smock Alley Theatre in 1733. For several years he alternated between Smock Alley and the Ransford Street Theatre, also in Dublin. In 1739 he appeared in London at Covent Garden and Drury Lane in George Farquhar's The Twin Rivals.

Returning for Dublin for several years he featured at the new Aungier Street Theatre. From 1745 to 1748 he was part of the company at Drury Lane, before shifting to Covent Garden in October 1748 where he remained until 1765. By 1761 he was earning £7 a week. He retired in 1765, possibly due health and settled in Brentford. His son James Sparks also acted briefly on the London stage.

References

Bibliography
 Highfill, Philip H, Burnim, Kalman A. & Langhans, Edward A. A Biographical Dictionary of Actors, Actresses, Musicians, Dancers, Managers, and Other Stage Personnel in London, 1660-1800: Volume VIX. SIU Press, 1973.

18th-century Irish people
Irish male stage actors
British male stage actors
18th-century Irish male actors
18th-century British male actors
1711 births
1768 deaths
Male actors from Dublin (city)
Irish emigrants to Great Britain